Methenmadinone acetate (MMA), also known as methylenedehydroacetoxyprogesterone (MDAP) and sold under the brand names Superlutin and Antigest, is a progestin medication which was developed in Czechoslovakia in the 1960s. It is the C17α acetate ester of methenmadinone.

MMA given orally shows about 13-fold the progestogenic activity of parenteral progesterone in animal bioassays.

Analogues of methenmadinone acetate include methenmadinone caproate (MMC), which was studied in combination with estradiol valerate as a combined injectable contraceptive (tentative brand name Lutofollin); chlormethenmadinone acetate (chlorsuperlutin; SCH-12600; 6-chloro-MMA), which has been used in combination with mestranol in birth control pills (brand names Biogest, Sterolibrin, Antigest B) and in veterinary medicine (brand name Agelin); bromethenmadinone acetate (bromsuperlutin; 6-bromo-MMA), which was assessed but was never marketed; and melengestrol acetate (methylsuperlutin; 6-methyl-MMA), which is used in veterinary medicine.

See also
 List of progestogen esters § Esters of 17α-hydroxyprogesterone derivatives
 16-Methylene-17α-hydroxyprogesterone acetate

References

Abandoned drugs
Acetate esters
Diketones
Pregnanes
Progestogen esters
Progestogens
Vinylidene compounds